Kronig isthmus is a band of resonance representing the apex of lung, also it's described as the narrow strap-like portion of the resonant field that extends over the shoulder, that connect the larger areas of resonance over the pulmonary apex in front and behind.

Boundaries
 Medially: Scalene

 Laterally: Acromion process

 Anteriorly: Clavicle

 Posteriorly: Trapezius

References

Lung anatomy